Rockford is an unincorporated community in Redding Township, Jackson County, Indiana.

History 

Rockford was named for the "rocky ford" of the East Fork of the White River where easier crossing was permitted by a rock river bottom.

The village is approximately 1 mile west of Tipton Island along the White River.  The area was first settled in about 1813 by James Reno, who was the grandfather of the infamous Reno Gang.

The small community was known as New Rockford and Old Rockford in the 1840s.

In 1852, the terminus of the north-south Jeffersonville, Madison and Indianapolis Railroad was in Rockford.

It was known as a pork packing center and had several established businesses such as a grist mill, post office, Masonic Lodge and a newspaper.

The last newspaper, the Rockford Herald, was printed by Dr Jasper Monroe in 1857. He was persuaded to move to nearby Seymour, Indiana by the town's founder, Meedy Shields, where he published under the name Seymour Times.1

Meedy Shields, through skillful maneuvering, succeeded in getting a new east-west rail stop of the Ohio and Mississippi Railroad two miles south of Rockford, which spelled eventual economic doom.

Most original structures were burned out in the 1860s and much of the unkept property was owned by the Reno family.1

Citations 

1 The Masked Halters by Edwin J Boley 1977, rare - out of print

References

Further reading

See wiki's Reno Gang page for external links which describe the eventual demise and criminal activity in and around Rockford in the 1860s.

External links 
 History of Jackson Masonic Lodge 146

Geography

Unincorporated communities in Jackson County, Indiana
Unincorporated communities in Indiana